Jill Astbury is an Australian researcher in the field of women's mental health.

Biography 

Astbury was deputy director of the Key Centre for Women's Health in Society, a World Health Organisation centre. She left this position to join Victoria University in Melbourne, Australia, as research professor in psychology. Her work focuses on the relationship between gender based violence including sexual violence and gender disparities in mental health including increased rates of depression, anxiety and post traumatic stress disorder.

Publications 

 Crazy for You: The making of women's madness (Oxford University Press, 1996)
 Women's mental health: an evidence based review (WHO, 2000)
 Gender disparities in Mental Health (WHO, 2001)
 Services for victim/survivors of sexual assault : identifying needs, interventions and provision of services in Australia (Australian Institute of Family Studies, 2006)

Recognition 

In 2008, Astbury was inducted into the Victorian Honour Roll of Women for her research into violence against women.

References 

Living people
Academic staff of the Victoria University, Melbourne
Australian psychologists
Australian women psychologists
Year of birth missing (living people)
Australian women scientists